Antunović is a South Slavic surname, a patronymic of Antun.

Notable people with the name include:

 Adrian Antunović (born 1989), Croatian footballer
 Andela Antunović (born 2002), Montenegrin swimmer
 Božidar Antunović (born 1991), Serbian shot putter
 Darko Antunovic HAOK Mladost (born 1972), Croatian volleyball player
 Davor Antunović (born 1979), popular German author and psychotherapist
 Duško Antunović (1947-2012), Croatian water polo player
 Goran Antunovič (born 1989), Slovak footballer
 Hana Antunovic, Swedish karateka
 Ivan Antunović (1815-1888), Croatian writer
 Mike Antunovic, New Zealand criminal defence lawyer
 Saša Antunović (born 1974), Serbian footballer
 Zdravko Antunović (born 1974), Croatian darts player
 Željka Antunović (born 1955), Croatian politician

See also

Croatian surnames
Patronymic surnames
Serbian surnames